Chinagantyada is a neighborhood situated on the  Visakhapatnam City, India. The area, which falls under the local administrative limits of Greater Visakhapatnam Municipal Corporation, .

Transport
APSRTC routes

References

Neighbourhoods in Visakhapatnam